WXVW (1450 AM) is a radio station licensed to Jeffersonville, Indiana, serving the Louisville, Kentucky, area. The station is currently owned by Word Broadcasting Network, Inc.

Under ownership of Cumulus Media, WXVW formerly simulcasted sports formatted WQKC 93.9 FM as "The Ticket", until that station changed to a classic hits music format under the call sign WLCL on November 20, 2008.

On August 2, 2010, WQKC and WLCL went silent after Cumulus decided to cease operations in the Louisville market.

On October 3, 2011, WQKC returned to the air, again with sports, branded as "The Sports Buzz". Cumulus would formally sell the station to its programmer, Ryan Media, in November 2011.

On May 21, 2013, WQKC changed their call letters to WXVW, which were the station's original call letters from its original sign on date (September 16, 1961-same as WLKY-TV) until 1997, when the call sign changed to WAVG.

Effective December 1, 2020, Ryan Media sold WXVW and translator W241CK to Word Broadcasting Network, Inc.

References

External links

XVW
Radio stations established in 1961
1961 establishments in Indiana
Sports radio stations in the United States
CBS Sports Radio stations